= Joseph Lonchampt =

Joseph Lonchampt (1825–1890) was a French stockbroker and positivist writer.

Lonchampt had a religious view of positivism, composing a series of prayers dedicated to the "New great Being" i.e. "Humanity". He claimed that prayer or meditation as a mental exercise would ensure success and constituted a useful instrument to realise both personal and social improvement.

In 1859 he was appointed professor of Popular Astronomy at the Association Polytechnique pour le développement de l'instruction publique.

== Works ==
- Essai sur la prière (1852) Lyon: C. Savy (English translation Positivist Prayer (1877) trans John G. Mills)
